HMS Pitt was a 74-gun third rate ship of the line of the Royal Navy, built by Nicholas Diddams and launched on 13 April 1816 at Portsmouth Dockyard.

Intended for use in the Napoleonic Wars the end of the wars rendered her obsolete even before she was launched. Her huge crew of 590 men was a huge burden on the state during peace time. She never served any military function.

Pitt was sold for use as a "coal depot" in 1860, sitting In Portsmouth Docks but purely to hold coal brought in by sea from the north to serve the south of England. She was broken up in 1877.

Notes

References

Lavery, Brian (2003) The Ship of the Line - Volume 1: The development of the battlefleet 1650-1850. Conway Maritime Press. .

Ships of the line of the Royal Navy
Vengeur-class ships of the line
1816 ships